The Men's 50 Backstroke event at the 10th FINA World Aquatics Championships swam July 26–27, 2003 in Barcelona, Spain. Preliminary and Semifinal heats were on July 26, with the Final swum on July 27.

Prior to the start of the event, the existing World (WR) and Championship (CR) records were:
WR: 24.99 swum by Lenny Krayzelburg (USA) on August 28, 1999 in Sydney, Australia
CR: 25.31 swum by Thomas Rupprath (Germany) on July 24, 2001 in Fukuoka, Japan

Results

Final

Semifinals

Preliminaries

References

Swimming at the 2003 World Aquatics Championships